Securities Daily is a Beijing-based securities newspaper sponsored by the Economic Daily Press Group. It is published in Chinese by the Securities Daily Office, and is publicly distributed in the whole China. The newspaper was officially launched on 18 October 2000.

Securities Daily is one of the media outlets authorised by the China Securities Regulatory Commission to issue public disclosures. And it is one of the four major securities newspapers in Mainland China.

References

Newspapers established in 2000
Daily newspapers published in China
Newspapers published in Beijing